The 2002 Music City Bowl was the fifth edition of the bowl game. It was played at LP Field in Nashville, Tennessee on December 30, 2002, and featured the Arkansas Razorbacks and the Minnesota Golden Gophers. Sponsored by Gaylord Hotels, it was officially named the Gaylord Hotels Music City Bowl.

Game recap
Arkansas started the game with a 2-yard touchdown pass from quarterback Matt Jones to wide receiver George Wilson. Kicker Dan Nystrom got Minnesota on the board with a 24-yard field goal. He added another 45 yard field goal to make the score 7–6. In the second quarter, he added field goals of 21 and 22 yards, as Minnesota staked a 12–6 halftime lead.

Quarterback Asad Abdul-Khaliq threw a 19-yard touchdown pass to tight end Ben Utecht for a 19–9 lead. In the fourth quarter, Nystrom added his fifth field goal of the game, to put the Gophers ahead 22–7. Thomas Tapeh rushed for a 33-yard touchdown as Minnesota built a 29–7 lead. Ryan Sorahan threw a touchdown pass to Richard Smith to cut the lead to 29–14.

The attendance of 39,183 is (as of 2017) the lowest attendance for any Music City Bowl.

References

External links
 USA Today game summary

Music City Bowl
Music City Bowl
Arkansas Razorbacks football bowl games
Minnesota Golden Gophers football bowl games
December 2002 sports events in the United States
2002 in sports in Tennessee